Éric Woerth (born 29 January 1956) is a French politician of The Republicans (LR).

Early life and education
Woerth was born in Creil, Oise. He studied at Panthéon-Assas University, HEC School of Management and Institut d'Études Politiques de Paris.

Political career

Career in local politics
Municipal Council

Mayor of Chantilly, Oise : 1995-2004 (Resignation) / And since 2005. Reelected in 2001, 2005, 2008.

Deputy-mayor of Chantilly, Oise : 2004–2005.

Municipal councillor of Chantilly, Oise : Since 1995. Reelected in 2001, 2008.

Community of communes Council

President of the Communauté de communes of the aire cantilenne : Since 1995. Reelected in 2001, 2008.

Member of the Communauté de communes of the aire cantilienne : Since 1995. Reelected in 2001, 2008.

Vice-president of the Regional Council of Picardy : 1992–1998.

Regional councillor of Picardy : 1986-2002 (Resignation). Reelected in 1992, 1998.

Member of the National Assembly, 2002–2004
Woerth was elected député for Oise in 2002. In parliament, he served on the Finance Committee from 2002 until 2004.

In addition to his parliamentary work, Woerth was the treasurer of the UMP until he resigned in July 2010.

Career in government
Woerth was state secretary for state reform in the government of Prime Minister Jean-Pierre Raffarin from 2004 to 2005.

Woerth founded the "club de la boussole", a group of UMP députés, and is a member of the Réformateurs, a liberal trend within the UMP.

Woerth was the Minister for the Budget, Public Accounts and the Civil Service from 2007 until 2010, in the government of Prime Minister François Fillon.<ref>Communiqué de la Présidence de la République concernant la composition du gouvernement de M. François FILLON, Premier ministre. , Élysée Palace, 18 May 2007.</ref> In this capacity, he oversaw French authorities obtaining Swiss bank account data amid a push to catch tax cheats.

Woerth later served as Minister of Labor, Solidarity and Civil Service from March until November 2010.

Member of the National Assembly, 2010–present
In parliament, Woerth served on the Committee on Foreign Affairs from 2010 until 2012 before moving to the Finance Committee in 2012. In addition to his committee assignments, he has been a member of the Franco-German Parliamentary Assembly since 2019.

In the Republicans' 2016 presidential primaries, Woerth endorsed François Fillon as the party's candidate for the office of President of France. In the Republicans' 2017 leadership election, he endorsed Laurent Wauquiez.

In July 2019, Woerth was one of the few LR members who abstained from a vote on the French ratification of the European Union's Comprehensive Economic and Trade Agreement (CETA) with Canada.

Together with Benjamin Dirx, Woerth published a non-legally binding report in 2019 which garnered international attention for its recommendations on preventing short-sellers and activists from unfairly destabilising French corporates. These included widening the disclosures of short positions to derivatives instruments, pushing for more transparency around the borrowing and lending of stock, and investigating whether market functions are jeopardised once short selling reaches a certain volume of shares.Laurence Boisseau (3 December 2019), L'activiste Muddy Waters défend les vertus de la vente à découvert Les Échos.

Ahead of the 2022 presidential elections, Woerth publicly declared his support for incumbent Emmanuel Macron and criticized the Republicans’ candidate Valérie Pécresse.Michel Rose and Sophie Louet (11 February 2022), French conservative contender woos Sarkozy to save campaign Reuters.

Following the 2022 legislative election, Woerth stood as a candidate for the National Assembly's presidency; in an internal vote, he lost against Yaël Braun-Pivet.

Legal difficulties
On 5 July 2010, following its investigations on the Liliane Bettencourt and Éric Woerth political controversy, the online newspaper Mediapart revealed a report where Claire Thibout, an ex-accountant working for Liliane Bettencourt, accused Nicolas Sarkozy and Woerth of receiving illegal campaign donations in 2007, in cash.Financial Times The Canard enchaîné and Marianne weeklies later revealed that Woerth authorized the sale of the Compiegne racetrack to a group with close connections to the UMP, for a very low price and through an improper procedure. He was placed under formal investigation by the Cour de Justice de la République for that sale. All charges against him were dismissed in 2015.

He has been put under investigation in 2018 in the alleged Libyan financing in the 2007 French presidential election  and in 2021 in the Bernard Tapie case.

References

 External links 
 Éric Woerth's blog 
 Affaire Bettencourt : les banques suisses chargent Eric Woerth, Le Monde (2 July 2010) 
 la justice rattrape woerth au pas de course, Libération (17 November 2010) 
 eric-woerth-aurait-bien-brade-l-hippodrome-de-compiegne,Le Monde'' (21 January 2012) 

1956 births
Living people
People from Creil
Paris 2 Panthéon-Assas University alumni
HEC Paris alumni
Sciences Po alumni
Politicians of the French Fifth Republic
French Ministers of Budget
French Ministers of Civil Service
Mayors of places in Hauts-de-France
The Republicans (France) politicians
Deputies of the 12th National Assembly of the French Fifth Republic
Deputies of the 13th National Assembly of the French Fifth Republic
Deputies of the 14th National Assembly of the French Fifth Republic
Deputies of the 15th National Assembly of the French Fifth Republic
La République En Marche! politicians
Deputies of the 16th National Assembly of the French Fifth Republic